Ossa Cave is a cave at Mount Ossa in Greece. According to reports, the cave contained inscriptions.

In literature
The Cave of Ossa, is mentioned in the book De mundo, on page 1. An archaeology expedition, reviewed in an article from 1909 discussed, A Cave of the Nymphs on Mount Ossa. The cave is mentioned in Stable Places and Changing Perceptions: Cave Archaeology in Greece (2013).

References

Caves of Greece
Greek mythology
Landforms of Larissa (regional unit)
Landforms of Thessaly